Musa Otieno (born 29 December 1973 in Nairobi) is a Kenyan former footballer.

Career

Club
Otieno has enjoyed an illustrious career on his native continent, playing for AFC Leopards and Tusker FC in Kenya, and from 1997 until 2011 for Santos in the South African Premier Soccer League. He helped them win the PSL title in 2001-02, the Bob Save Super Bowl in 2001, the BP Top 8in 2002, and the ABSA Cup in 2003. 

Otieno first came to the United States in 2008, playing a season on loan with the Cleveland City Stars in the USL Second Division. He made his debut for the Stars on 4 July 2008, as a 64th-minute substitute for Mark Schulte, and went on to make seven appearances, scoring one goal, and helping them to the USL2 title.

On 15 December 2008, following the conclusion Santos' domestic season, Otieno returned to the Cleveland City Stars to play in their debut season in the USL First Division in 2009.

Otieno retired in 2011 having made over 300 appearances and scoring more than 30 goals for Santos.

He is the current Assistant technical manager for Morocco National Team.

International
Otieno is one of Kenya's most successful and decorated footballers, having made his national team debut for Kenya against Zaire in 1993 at the age of 19. He captained The Harambee Stars numerous times. He was also a member of the Kenyan 2004 African Nations Cup team, who finished in third place of their group in the first round of competition, thus failing to secure qualification for the quarter-finals.

He made 90 appearances for the Kenyan national team, scoring 9 goals.

Former Harambee Stars captain Musa Otieno assumes his new role as national football team assistant coach on Thursday. 
Otieno was on Monday named in the national team's technical bench in the preparations for the 2012 Africa Cup of Nations qualifier against Guinea Bissau.

Personal
Otieno owns and operates a community outreach foundation in his home country, called the Musa Otieno Foundation.

References

External links
CCS bio

1973 births
Living people
Footballers from Nairobi
Kenyan footballers
Association football defenders
Association football utility players
USL Second Division players
Cleveland City Stars players
Kenya international footballers
Kenyan expatriate footballers
Expatriate soccer players in South Africa
Expatriate soccer players in the United States
Tusker F.C. players
A.F.C. Leopards players
Santos F.C. (South Africa) players
2004 African Cup of Nations players
Kenyan expatriates in South Africa
Kenyan expatriates in the United States